FeDerius Terrell Edmunds (born January 20, 1997) is an American football safety who is a free agent. He played college football at Virginia Tech.

Early years
Edmunds attended Dan River High School in Ringgold, Virginia. Terrell started at both running back and defensive back over three varsity seasons but primarily focused on tailback, rushing for a career total of 2,438 rushing yards and 33 touchdowns on 263 carries, averaging 9.3 yards per carry. He also caught 43 passes for 396 yards and 3 receiving touchdowns, while finishing his defensive career with 112 tackles, 5 interceptions, and 3 fumble recoveries. He committed to Virginia Tech to play college football.

College career
Edmunds played a key defensive role at Virginia Tech starting at Strong Safety and sharing time at middle linebacker from 2015 to 2017. After his junior season in 2017, he decided to forgo his senior year and enter the 2018 NFL Draft. He finished his career with 196 tackles, six interceptions, and 1.5 sacks.

Professional career
On January 6, 2018, Edmunds announced his decision to forgo his remaining eligibility and enter the 2018 NFL Draft. Edmunds and his brother Tremaine released joint statements on their Twitter accounts regarding their declaration for the draft. He attended the NFL Scouting Combine in Indianapolis, but was unable to perform all of the combine and positional drills due to a pre-existing shoulder injury and after developing cramps.

On March 14, 2018, Edmunds participated at Virginia Tech's pro day, but opted to stand on his combine numbers and only performed positional drills. At the conclusion of the pre-draft process, Edmunds was projected to be a third round pick by the majority of NFL draft experts and scouts. He was also ranked the third best strong safety in the draft by DraftScout.com and was ranked the sixth best safety by NFL analyst Mike Mayock.

2018
The Pittsburgh Steelers selected Edmunds in the first round (28th overall) of the 2018 NFL Draft. Edmunds was the third safety drafted in 2018.

On July 24, 2018, the Pittsburgh Steelers signed Edmunds to a four-year, $10.80 million contract that includes a signing bonus of $6 million. Throughout training camp, Edmunds competed to be a starting safety against veterans Morgan Burnett and Sean Davis. Head coach Mike Tomlin named Edmunds the backup strong safety, behind Morgan Burnett, to begin the regular season.

He made his professional regular season debut and first career start in the Pittsburgh Steelers’ season-opener at the Cleveland Browns and broke up one pass attempt during a 21–21 tie. Edmunds started in place of Morgan Burnett in the season-opener and became the permanent starting strong safety in Week 3 after Burnett was inactive for four games (Weeks 3-6) due to a groin injury. On September 24, 2018, Edmunds recorded one tackle, deflected a pass, and made his first career interception during a 30–27 win at the Tampa Bay Buccaneers in Week 3. Edmunds intercepted a pass by Buccaneers’ quarterback Ryan Fitzpatrick that was intended for wide receiver Mike Evans, and returned it for a 35-yard gain during the second quarter. In Week 12, Edmunds collected a season-high nine solo during a 24–17 loss at the Denver Broncos. On December 2, 2018, he recorded eight combined tackles, deflected a pass, and made his first career sack as the Steelers lost 33–30 against the Los Angeles Chargers in Week 13. He finished his rookie season in 2018 with 78 combined tackles (55 solo), four pass deflections, one sack, and one interception in 16 games and 15 starts. He received an overall grade of 63.7 from Pro Football Focus, which ranked 66th among all safeties in 2018.

2019
In Week 2 against the Seattle Seahawks, Edmunds recorded a team high 11 tackles as the Steelers lost 26-28. Edmunds started all 16 games in his second season, recording 105 tackles, two for loss,  and 3 pass defenses.

2020
In Week 2 against the Denver Broncos, Edmunds recorded his first sack of the season on Jeff Driskel during the 26–21 win. In Week 11 against the Jacksonville Jaguars, Edmunds recorded his first two interceptions of the season off of passes thrown by Jake Luton during the 27–3 win.

2021
The Steelers declined to exercise the fifth-year option on Edmunds' contract on May 3, 2021, making him a free agent after the 2021 season.

2022
On April 25, 2022, Edmunds signed a one-year deal to return to the Steelers.

Personal life
His brothers, Trey and Tremaine also played college football at Virginia Tech. Trey and Tremaine also play in the NFL. Trey is a free agent that has played for the Saints and Steelers while Tremaine plays for the Buffalo Bills. Their father, Ferrell Edmunds, also played in the NFL as a tight end. Ferrell was a two-time Pro Bowler with the Miami Dolphins as a tight end. Along with Tremaine, he was part of the first set of brothers to be drafted in the first round of the same NFL Draft.

References

External links
Virginia Tech Hokies bio
Pittsburgh Steelers bio

1997 births
Living people
Sportspeople from Danville, Virginia
Players of American football from Virginia
American football safeties
Virginia Tech Hokies football players
Pittsburgh Steelers players